The 1924 Isle of Man Tourist Trophy saw the introduction of the Ultra-Lightweight class for motorcycles of 175 cc capacity that was run only twice, in 1924 and 1925. This was the second year of the Sidecar race that would also be dropped after 1925.

The Ultra-Lightweight TT began with a massed-start for competitors rather than pairs as with the normal time-trial format of the TT races.

Senior TT (500cc)

Junior TT (350cc)
6 laps (226.38 miles) – Mountain Course.

Lightweight TT (250 cc)
6 laps (226.38 miles) – Mountain Course.

Ultra-Lightweight TT
It was held on Wednesday, June 25th, 1924 over a distance of 113  miles and 380 yards, 3 laps of 37.75 miles each. The machines were limited of cylinder capacity not exceeding 175cc. All seventeen riders  started the race simultaneously, only twenty yards separating the last numbered man from the first. Eleven riders finished.

Sidecar TT
It was held on Wednesday, June 25th, 1924 at 2:00pm over a distance of 150  miles and 1,680 yards, 4 laps of 37.75 miles each. Sidecar TT machines were limited of cylinder capacity not exceeding 600cc. Out of 10 entries, nine started the race at one minute intervals and only five finished.

References

External links
Detailed race results
 Mountain Course map

1924 in British motorsport
1924
Isle